Rakesh Jhaveri, also known as Pujya Gurudevshri Rakeshbhai and Pujya Gurudevshri Rakeshji, (born 26 September 1966) is a spiritual leader, mystic, scholar of Jainism, author and orator from India. Spiritually inclined from a young age, he is a follower of Shrimad Rajchandra, a Jain spiritual teacher. He completed doctoral studies on Shrimad's work Atmasiddhi. He founded Shrimad Rajchandra Mission, Dharampur which supports spiritual and social activities.

Early life
Rakesh Jhaveri was born in Mumbai, India on 26 September 1966 to Dilip and Rekha Jhaveri, who followed the Shwetambara Murtipujaka tradition of Jainism. In 1968, Sahaj Anandji, a monk from Rajasthan who had established Shrimad Rajchandra Ashram at Hampi, was at Palitana. Rakesh's parents were influenced by Sahaj Anandji who died in 1970 and was succeeded by Mataji. 

In 1972, Rakesh began his academic studies at Activity High School in Mumbai. From an early age, he was spiritually inclined. From the age of four he began speaking on Jain philosophy. He first encountered Shrimad Rajchandra when a copy of  fell and he saw the photograph of Shrimad Rajchandra.

In 1978, Rakesh visited Hampi and stayed for eighteen months. A satsang-mandal (devotional group) was formed by 1978 and some followers had already started to call him guru by 1980. During his visit to his aunt in Jaipur, he decided to devote rest of his life to spiritual activities. In 1983, he visited Hampi again and stayed there for two years. There he was nominated as Mataji's successor. In 1985, he returned to Mumbai upon his parents' request and started studying religious texts, practicing yoga and learning Indian classical music. He observed silence for twelve hours a day and traveled extensively between 1985 and 1990. During this period, the number of followers around him continued to grow. During his holidays in Nepal, he decided to pursue the college studies.

He completed B. A. from Osmania University, Hyderabad, in 1988. In 1989, he visited Antwerp for his father's treatment where his discourses were attended by increasing number of followers. He completed M. A. in Philosophy in 1991 from the University of Mumbai. He started his doctoral studies on Atmasiddhi, a spiritual work composed by Shrimad Rajchandra, in January 1994 under Ramanlal Shah. He was awarded PhD on 2 December 1998 by the University of Mumbai. He had vowed not to give a public discourse until his PhD was completed. He gave his first public discourse in Rajkot on 13 April 2001.

Spiritual works

Rakesh Jhaveri, known as Pujya Gurudevshri Rakeshji established Shrimad Rajchandra Adhyatmik Satsang Sadhana Kendra in 1994 to organise his followers which was later succeeded by the Shrimad Rajchandra Mission Dharampur. On 13 May 1999, the construction of an ashram spread across  at Dharampur was started and was opened in April 2001. The ashram is located on the hillock of Mohangadh which was an estate of the last ruler of the erstwhile Dharampur State. In 2002, he started initiating followers, s, who give up worldly possessions and commit to celibacy. He gives the series of discourses to his followers at the ashram throughout the year. He also prescribes an annual scriptural study schedule to his followers.

He established Shrimad Rajchandra Love and Care (SRLC); a non-governmental organisation that provides medical, educational and humanitarian services; in 2003. The NGO received a special consultative status with the United Nations Economic and Social Council in 2020 due to its projects that work towards the UN Sustainable Development Goals.

In November 2016, the Mission produced a play, Yugpurush: Mahatma na Mahatma depicting spiritual relationship between Shrimad Rajchandra and Mahatma Gandhi. The Mission opened a science college in Dharampur, Shrimad Rajchandra Vidyapeeth, the same month. In November 2017, the 34-feet tall statue of Shrimad Rajchandra was unveiled at the ashram. By 2017, the Mission had 102 Satsang centres, 39 Youth Group Centres and 227 Divine Touch Centres worldwide. In 2019, the Mission and the Sangeet Natak Akademi co-produced a play Bharat Bhagya Vidhata focused on how Mahatma Gandhi cultivated the values of truth and non-violence. The Mission gifted statue of Mahatma Gandhi to the city of Manchester to serve as a "symbol of love and compassion" following the 2017 Manchester Arena bombing. It was unveiled in November 2019. On April 25, 2021, Shrimad Rajchandra Hospital established a 150-bed COVID Care Centre in Dharampur during COVID-19 pandemic in India.

Personal life
Though he follows several principles of Jain monasticism, such as observing mahavratas (major vows), he does not consider himself a monk. He resides with his followers at the ashram in Dharampur and with his family when in Mumbai.

Recognition
He was awarded the Gandhi Seva Medal by the Gandhi Global Family, an NGO, in 2017.

Bibliography
 2011 – A Life Worth Living - Inspiring seekers to lead a Meaningful life , 187 pp. 
 2011 – Embark on the Inner Journey: Transformation through introspection , 217 pp. 
 2012 – The Path Enlightened - Discovering the essence of religion, 179 pp. 
 2012 – Seek Thy Eternal Self, 179 pp. 
 2013 – Bliss Within - Shattering the illusion of false happiness,to attain true joy , 210 pp. 
 2013 – Time to Awaken - "Guidance for bringing an end to transmigration and accelerating the journey to liberation, 219 pp. 
 2014 – Shrimad Rajchandra - Saga of Spirituality, 275 pp. 
 2015 – A Divine Union, 162 pp. 
 2016 – Sadguru Insights: 50 Enlightening Lessons from the Master, 208 pp. 
 2016 – Sadguru Communion, 117 pp. 
 2016 – Sadguru Nuggets, 135 pp. 
 2016 – Sadguru Alerts - 50 Insightful Questions from the Master, 64 pp. 
 2019 – Sadguru Capsules - Weekly Profound Contemplations from the Master, 119 pp. 
 2021 - Atmasiddhi Shastra: Six Spiritual Truths of the Soul (Concise & Complete Commentary), 568 pp.

Notes and references

Notes

References

Bibliography

External links
Shrimad Rajchandra Mission

Living people
1966 births
Writers from Mumbai
20th-century Indian Jains
Gujarati-language writers
Indian religious leaders
University of Mumbai alumni
Osmania University alumni
Jain reformers
21st-century Indian Jains
People from Mumbai
Gujarati people